Sir William Douglas was a slave ship in the triangular trade in enslaved people, acquired by British interests in 1801. She made one complete slave-trading voyage and was captured in 1803 after having delivered slaves on her second voyage.

Career
There is some ambiguity about Sir William Douglass origins. Lloyd's Register (LR) reported that she was launched in 1800 in San Sebastian. The Register of Shipping (RS) gave her origin as a Spanish prize taken in 1800. The Trans-Atlantic Slave Trade database reports that he was built in 1799 at Ramsgate. 

1st slave voyage (1801–1802): Captain William Hannay acquired a letter of marque on 22 August 1801. He sailed from London on 5 September, bound for Africa. In February 1802, Lloyd's List reported that Sir William Douglas, Shaw, master, had arrived at Bonny. In April she arrived at Charleston.. (Lloyd's List reported in June that Sir William Douglas was off Charleston. She arrived back at London on 13 July.

2nd slave voyage (1803-Loss): Sir William Douglas had arrived back at London during the Peace of Amiens and when Captain J. Mayers sailed from London on 5 February 1803, the peace was still in place. Consequently, Mayers did not acquire a letter of marque. Lloyd's List reported in November that William Douglas, Shaw, master, was off Barbados, bound for Charleston. She arrived at Savannah in October and landed her slaves there.

Fate
In January 1804 Lloyd's List reported that Sir William Douglas had been taken n her way to London and that her captain had arrived at Bordeaux.

Citations

1801 ships
London slave ships
Captured ships